The faithful sayings (translated as trustworthy saying in the NIV) are sayings in the pastoral epistles of the New Testament. There are five sayings with this label, and the Greek phrase is the same in all instances, although the KJV uses a different word in 1 Timothy 3:1. George W. Knight III argues that the sayings are "self-conscious creedal/liturgical expressions of the early church" which "either speak in terms of the person and work of Christ or reflect a teaching or saying of Christ," and thus "show the orientation to Christ of the early church."

The sayings

See also
 List of Christian creeds

References

External links
 International Standard Bible Encyclopedia article

Pastoral epistles
New Testament words and phrases
Christian statements of faith